Epicerynea is a genus of moths of the family Noctuidae. The genus was erected by George Hampson in 1914.

Species
Epicerynea elegans (Berio, 1959) Madagascar
Epicerynea goniosema Hampson, 1914 Ghana, Uganda
Epicerynea simillima Hacker, 2019 Nigeria, Gabon

References

Acontiinae